SMTV Live (an abbreviation of Saturday Morning Television Live, and also stylised as SM: LIVE) was a British Saturday morning children's television programme, produced by Blaze Television for ITV. Operating on a similar format to other Saturday morning programmes for children, such as BBC's Live & Kicking, the programme premiered on 29 August 1998 and ran for over 270 episodes across five years, before its conclusion on 27 December 2003.

The programme's format focused on a collection of sketches, competitions and challenges, alongside a compilation of children's programmes and cartoons. The programme proved a major success, contributing to furthering the careers of Ant McPartlin and Declan Donnelly under the partnership of Ant & Dec, as well as promoting the broadcast of Japanese anime series Pokémon on British television. SMTV Live became notable for various elements including a sketch based on Pokémon, the phone competition of "Wonkey Donkey", and the late morning edition of CD:UK that the presenters of the programme were involved in towards the end of the morning schedule. The programme was regularly popular with its audiences, attracting around 2.5 million viewers.

Following its conclusion, Ant & Dec's former company Gallowgate Holdings Limited retained the rights to the show. In April 2017, the duo made a proposal for a 20th anniversary special to reunite them with co-presenter Cat Deeley, but despite an announcement of it being revived during the 2017 British Academy Television Awards, ITV later stated that the proposal had been dropped.

On 26 December 2020, a one-off reunion documentary aired on ITV under the title The Story of SM:TV Live, featuring Ant, Dec and Cat reminiscing on their time on the show.

The series' iconic sketch "Chums" was recreated for the fifth episode of Series 17 of Ant & Dec's Saturday Night Takeaway on 20 March 2021 which reenacts and picks up the cliffhanger from the wedding episode 20 years ago which signaled the duo's retirement from SMTV Live on 1 December 2001.

Format
SMTV Live operated on a live-television format for its timeslot on Saturday. Alongside the involvement of audience of children and celebrity guests - including bands - the programme mostly consisted of studio segments that were interwoven around regular children programming used during the show's over 2-hour timeslot. Studio segments frequently featured sketches by the presenters, competitions (including phone-ins), and other features.

Programming
Children's programming featured on SMTV Live consisted of two categories - cartoons and live-action programmes:

Sketches
Presenters often conducted a variety of sketches on the programme during SMTV Lives broadcast. Most were performed by McPartlin and Donnelly, with assistance from Deeley, with many often being parodies of programmes being aired between 1998 - 2003. The most prominent sketches used on the programme included:

 "Dec Says" - The sketch revolved around Donnelly answering a letter from a fictional viewer about a personal problem in which he would recount how he handled a similar issue in the past. However, the scene would often be depicted in a flashback recalled differently by McPartlin. The "real story" featured Donnelly portrayed as an inconsiderate, cheeky schoolboy referred to as "Downright Dirty Donnelly" who often got into trouble with the relevant problem, often with a character portrayed by the celebrity guest(s) for that week's episode. Deeley often appeared, portraying herself as a schoolgirl with very messy hair, huge teeth, and a strong Birmingham accent (an example of the accent being the line "it's ever so different from Bir-ming-ham!") who was referred to as "Cat the Dog", while McPartlin occasionally appeared, portrayed as an overweight boy who ate huge amounts of food and referred to as "Gi-ant".
 The sketch later was renamed as "The Secret of My Success", though always opening around a badly selling book that Dec had written. After McPartlin and Donnelly left the programme, the sketch was revised under a new title of "The Further Adventures of Cat the Dog" in which the flashback scenes were often opened and ended with Cat writing in her diary about the events of the day.
 "Chums" - A parody of the American sitcom Friends, the sketch involved Donnelly and Deeley involved in a romance, dealing with McPartlin and a serious problem, often joined by the celebrity guest(s) for that week's episode either as themselves or a character. The sketch was noted for opening on a parody version of the line "... is filmed in front of a live studio audience", and ending on a "freeze-frame" moment (a homage to the closing sequences of Police Squad!). Although the sketch acted a serial, plotlines were stand-alone and never interconnected, with the exception of the fictional romance between Donnelly and Deeley. The sketch later spawned a VHS compilation and weekday repeats as part of CITV. Chums continued for a few weeks after the departure of Ant & Dec, but finished quickly. However, during SM:TV Gold, no mention was made of this period and they treated Ant & Dec's departure episode as the last.
In March 2021, to celebrate the 20th anniversary of its final episode, "Chums" was revived for a one-off live episode as part of the "End-of-the-Show Show" on Ant & Dec's Saturday Night Takeaway.
 "PokéRap" and "Pokéfight" - These sketches were based upon the programme's regularly featured broadcasts of Pokémon, and were conducted primarily by McPartlin and Donnelly between 1998 and 2001. The rap sketches mainly involved the pair acting as rappers and conducting raps that featured the names of various Pokémon, while each wearing a knitted Pokémon jumper that featured both Pikachu and their own name upon it. The feature later developed with the addition of a weekly letters' segment with viewers sending in their own raps (mostly via home video), and the eventual participation of the celebrity guest(s) for that week's episode.
 The fight sketch also mainly involved McPartlin and Donnelly, and was the creation of the show's writers after being inspired by the cartoon series. The presenters portrayed different parody version of the anime's main characters, in which they fought using "Pokémon" named after the moves they performed on each other - an example of this was "Embarrassmon" which involved one dueller telling a secret about the other, which damaged their health as a result. The sketch often involved a graphic overlay, that was reminiscent of the video game of Pokémon.
 "Eminemmerdale" - A parody of the American rapper Eminem and the Yorkshire Television soap opera Emmerdale

Main features
Alongside sketches, the programme also featured a mixture of competitions - both phone-ins and studio-based - and other segments. Competition prizes differed from those offered by other Saturday morning children's programmes, by including more valuable items on offer including holidays. Amongst these segments that were used, the most notable included:

 "Postbag" - A segment for reading out viewer fan mail, which often began with the presenters, guests and audience dancing to the song "Please Mr. Postman" by The Carpenters. The segment featured three notable events during the tenure of McPartlin and Donnelly:
 During the episode broadcast on 1 April 2000, Donnelly pulled off an April Fool's joke by pretending to be slightly ill when opening the Mailbag segment and passing out unconscious. A few seconds after this, the programme moved towards airing the second half of a cartoon, before later returning after a commercial break to Donnelly revealing the truth. A later interview with both himself and McPartlin later revealed the joke had been devised to coincide with the date but had been unplanned and frowned upon by ITV.
 McPartlin once had to read out a rather crude anecdote, that caused him to fall into uncontrollable laughing alongside his co-presenter. The incident later was retained as a clip on the consideration that it appeared to be in the similar format of an "outtake".
 One letter sent to the presenters concerned the pronunciation of the word "Pokémon" and asked that it be pronounced as "Po-KAY-mon". However, when the second half of the Pokémon episode "Bulbasaur and the Hidden Village" and included the pronunciation the presenters had used, Donnelly paused the broadcast to review the moment before making a small rant to camera about the letter and then ripping it up before allowing the episode to resume. It was not made clear if the incident had been a stunt and intended to make a point on the subject.
 Magic - Many episodes featured the guest appearance of various magicians, who conducted small and large-scale illusions on the programme. These illusions often involved the participation of Deeley as an assistant, in which she commonly was involved in the "Sawing a woman in half" illusion. After Deeley left in 2002, her replacement Tess Daly took over to act as assistant on later illusions performed on SMTV Live.
 "Wonkey Donkey" - A phone-in competition for viewers to partake in, which operated in a similar manner to that of Catchphrase, but required contestants to answer with two words that rhymed together to match the object they showed - a golden rule of the competition. For example, the game's name itself of "Wonkey Donkey" pertained to describe the state of a small toy donkey which had one leg missing. Before contestants began, the presenters would showcase something similar, before taking calls from up to five viewers. Donnelly frequently often ranted in "anger" to camera when a young contestant couldn't get the answer, with the game often notable for featuring presenters using the catchphrase of "It's gotta rhyme!" As a rule, if none of the callers answered correctly, the competition would roll over to the next week - if after three weeks, no one had answered correctly, the object involved would be abandoned for a new one.
 The competition itself remained notable in ITV, receiving a mock version on Britain's Got More Talent and Celebrity Juice.
 "Challenge Ant" - A studio competition in which one of the young audience members would be challenged by Donnelly to give McPartlin ten questions they had prepared, usually based on that week's showbiz news. Each question he failed to answer correctly within a time-limit of ten seconds would result in the child winning a prize. After the ten questions had been given, Donnelly would offer the contestant a chance to gamble their prizes on a star prize, in which they asked McPartlin a further question - if answered incorrectly, the contestant would win all their prizes, but if answered correctly, the prizes and star prize would be put up for offer in a viewers' competition. Later episodes later gave the child contestant a consolation prize of a handkerchief reading "I lost on Challenge Ant", along with celebrity editions of the contest.
 After McPartlin and Donnelly left the programme, Deeley took over the contest under the title of Brian's Brain", challenging children to defeat Brian Dowling under the same format, with Daly taking over in 2002.
 "Eat My Goal" - A phone-in competition in which viewers chose a celebrity, who would proceed to take penalties against McPartlin in goal while Donnelly hosted the contest. The format was amended with Dowling as the goalkeeper in 2001, with Daly and later Stephen Mulhern hosting the competition. In 2003, the format was changed to a different celebrity each week representing two teams taking it in turns to be goalkeeper.

CD:UK

After the broadcast of an episode of SMTV Live, the episode was followed by the broadcast of CD:UK (an abbreviation of CountDown United Kingdom). The programme took place within the same studio and with the same presenters, and operated on its own live-television format, featuring bands in the UK Singles Chart, music videos, and interviews with famous music stars. The programme continued long after SMTV Live concluded, finally ending in April 2006.

Production

Presenters
SMTV Live was originally hosted by Byker Grove stars Ant & Dec alongside former fashion model Cat Deeley. In 2001, Ant & Dec left the show to present Saturday night talent show Pop Idol and were replaced by Hollyoaks star James Redmond. Redmond's stint at SMTV Live lasted just three months however, after show bosses decided he had not settled into the role. Deeley left the show in 2002 to focus on presenting BBC talent show Fame Academy, leaving SMTV with none of its original presenters. For the remainder of the programme, it was hosted by a string of other people, including Steps members Ian "H" Watkins and Claire Richards, Big Brother winner Brian Dowling, Tess Daly all who presented from 2002 until all 4 eventually left by 2003. Comedian Des Clarke, New Zealand actress Shavaughn Ruakere and magician Stephen Mulhern presented the show for its final run when it was renamed SMTV:Gold in which it focused on showing highlights of the best bits of the past 5 years of the show, mainly due to declining ratings since the departure of the original presenters.

Writers and producers
The first month of the show was produced by former Top of the Pops producer Ric Blaxill. He was replaced by Steve Pinhay, while Phil Mount was brought in as producer of CD:UK.

From 1999 until 2003, SMTV Live was produced by David Staite.

In its first year the show was written by Richard Preddy and Gary Howe as well as Dean Wilkinson who stayed with it until the end. In September 1999, Ben Ward and Gez Foster were brought in from rival BBC show, Live & Kicking, to work on semi-scripted features including 'Chums'. After a steady erosion of Live & Kickings initial popularity, SMTV overtook them in the ratings in October 1999 and never looked back.

Multi award-winning writer Dean Wilkinson was with the show throughout most of its run with Blaze Television's director of programmes Conor McAnally as its executive producer.

SMTV Gold
Falling viewing figures during 2003 led to the programme's axing at the end of the year. The programme marked the end of its five-year run with a series of SMTV Gold specials featuring highlights from the show and cartoons, presented by Stephen Mulhern and Des Clarke with different celebrity co-hosts each week. The Gold series ended on 20 December 2003 with the very last SMTV Live programme airing on Saturday 27 December 2003, recorded at the Riverside Studios in Hammersmith.

Cancellation and final episode
In August 2003, after two years of declining ratings following the departure of Ant & Dec, ITV announced the cancellation of SMTV Live, to be replaced by an as-yet untitled programme featuring "games, sketches, music and acquired programming, with increased interactive elements." CD:UK, however, would remain for the time being. Steven Andrew, ITV's controller of children's programmes, said: "After five fantastic years of SM:TV we all recognised it was time for a change. We have gone for a show that is all about fun with a team with bags of fresh ideas. I'm confident the new show, teamed with CD:UK, will be a compelling proposition for kids." The replacement show in question was Ministry of Mayhem.

On 27 December 2003, the grand finale which includes all the presenters singing a version of "My Way" by Frank Sinatra with the SMTV end credits rolling through the last chorus. And for the big finale, a special fireworks display with the words SMTV Live 1998-2003 written in it, and flashback voices from Ant Dec and Cat. The screen fades and SMTV comes to an end after five and a half years. No copyright text was written after the credits.

At one point, the Gold episodes were broadcast on Saturday afternoons because of morning coverage of the 2003 Rugby World Cup.

Video releases
The series spawned two video releases – the first, Chums, was released in 2000 by the Contender Entertainment Group and featured six full Chums episodes and a selection of other SMTV comedy segments. The VHS was released on DVD four years later, also by Contender.

A second release from Universal Pictures Video, The Best of SMTV Live So Far, was released in 2001, featuring specially produced links recorded shortly before Ant & Dec's departure and an extended compilation of sketches and segments.

Awards
SMTV Live was twice voted Best Entertainment Programme at the BAFTA Children's Film and Television Awards (2000 & 2002) and won BAFTA & British Comedy awards voted for by the public.

Ant & Dec won the Royal Television Society award for best presenter in 2001 for their work on the programme while Cat Deeley won the BAFTA for best children's presenter in the same year.

In 2014, it was in 5th place for Channel 5's 50 Greatest Kids TV Shows.

In 2001, it finished 27th place in a Channel 4 poll for the 100 Greatest Kids' TV Shows.

Reunion episode
On 4 September 2020, Ant & Dec revealed in an interview on BBC Radio 2 that they had filmed a one-off reunion episode with Deeley, in which the three of them would look back at SMTVs best bits. The following week, Deeley told The Chris Moyles Show that they went back to where the original show was filmed and producers rebuilt the old set. Later that month, Ant & Dec shared a teaser on Instagram. ITV confirmed that the reunion show would air on 26 December 2020 as The Story of SM:TV Live.

References

External links
 
 SMTV Live on Paul Morris' SatKids

Ant & Dec
1990s British children's television series
2000s British children's television series
1998 British television series debuts
2003 British television series endings
ITV sketch shows
English-language television shows
ITV children's television shows
BAFTA winners (television series)